Stephanorhinus is an extinct genus of two-horned rhinoceros native to Eurasia and North Africa that lived during the Pliocene to Late Pleistocene. Species of Stephanorhinus were the predominant and often only species of rhinoceros in much of temperate Eurasia, especially Europe, for most of the Pleistocene. Two species of Stephanorhinus – Merck's rhinoceros (S. kirchbergensis) and the narrow-nosed rhinoceros (S. hemitoechus) – persisted into the last glacial period.

Etymology 
The first part of the name, Stephano-, honours Stephen I, the first king of Hungary. (The genus name was coined by Kretzoi, a Hungarian.)

Taxonomy 
The taxonomic history of Stephanorhinus is long and convoluted, as many species are known by numerous synonyms and different genera – typically Rhinoceros and Dicerorhinus – for the 19th and most of the early 20th century. The genus was named by Miklós Kretzoi in 1942. It is thought that Stephanorhinus is more closely related to the Sumatran rhinoceros and woolly rhinoceros than other rhino species. A complete mitochondrial genome of S. kirchbergensis obtained from a 70,000–48,000-year-old skull preserved in permafrost in arctic Yakutia showed that it was more closely related to the woolly rhinoceros than the Sumatran rhinoceros, with the three species forming a clade to the exclusion of other living rhinoceros species. In 2019 a study of dental proteomes proposed that Stephanorhinius was paraphyletic as currently defined, with the proteome sequence obtained from the enamel of a 1.77 million year old Stephanorhinus tooth from Dmanisi belonging to an indeterminate species found outside the clade containing the woolly rhinoceros and S. kirchbergensis, with the authors positing that the genus Coelodonta was derived from an early diverging lineage within Stephanorhinus. A 2021 study based on nuclear genomes including those of S. kirchbergensis found the same result as the mitochondrial genome study, with strong support, with the estimated split between the woolly rhinoceros and S. kirchbergensis occurring around 5.5 million years ago, with their closest living relatives being Dicerorhinus. A 2023 morphological study recovered Stephanorhinus as monophyletic.

Species and evolution
The oldest known species of the genus are from the Pliocene of Europe, the species S. pikermiensis and S. megarhinus that were formerly considered to belong to Stephanorhinus are currently considered to belong to Dihoplus, while the positions of “Stephanorhinus” miguelcrusafonti from the Early Pliocene of Western Europe and Stephanorhinus? africanus from the Middle Pliocene of Tunisia and Chad are uncertain.

Stephanorhinus jeanvireti, also known as S. elatus is known from the Late Pliocene and Early Pleistocene of Europe. Its remains are relatively rare in comparison to other Stephanorhinus species. Specimens are known from the Late Pliocene of Germany, France, Italy, Slovakia and Greece, and the Early Pleistocene of Romania.

Stephanorhinus etruscus first appears in the latest Pliocene in the Iberian Peninsula, around 3.3 million years ago (Ma) at Las Higueruelas in Spain and before 3 Ma at Piedrabuena, and during the latest Pliocene at Villafranca d’Asti and Castelnuovo di Berardenga in Italy and is abundant during most of the Villafranchian period in Europe, and is the sole rhinoceros species in Europe between 2.5 and around 1.3 Ma. A specimen is known from the Early Pleistocene (1.6-1.2 Ma) Ubeidiya locality in Israel. During the late Early Pleistocene, it is largely replaced by S. hundsheimensis. The last known records of the species are from the latest Early Pleistocene of the Iberian peninsula, around 0.9-0.8 Ma.

Stephanorhinus migrated from its origin in western Eurasia into eastern Eurasia during the Early Pleistocene. Stephanorhinus yunchuchenensis is known from a single specimen in probably late Early Pleistocene aged deposits in Yushe, Shaanxi, China, while Stephanorhinus lantianensis is also known from a single specimen from late Early Pleistocene (1.15 Ma) deposits in Lantian, also in Shaanxi. These may be synonymous with other named Stephanorhinus species, with a 2022 study suggesting that they were likely synonyms of S. kirchbergensis and S. etruscus respectively.

The first definitive record of Stephanorhinus kirchbergensis (Merck's rhinoceros) is in China at Zhoukoudian (Choukoutien; near Beijing), around the Early–Mid-Pleistocene transition at 0.8 Ma.

Stephanorhinus hundsheimensis first definitively appears in the fossil record in Europe and Anatolia at around 1.2 Ma, with possible records in Iberia around 1.6 Ma and 1.4-1.3 Ma. The earliest confirmed appearance in Italy around 1 Ma. The diet of S. hundsheimensis was flexible and ungeneralised, with two different early Middle Pleistocene populations under different climatic regimes (having tooth wear analyses suggesting contrasting browsing and grazing habits). The more specialised S. kirchbergensis and S. hemitoechus, appear in Europe between 0.7-6 Ma and 0.6-0.5 Ma respectively, and replace S. hundsheimensis. S. kirchbergensis and S. hemitoechus are typically interpreted as a browsing form and grazing form, respectively. The evolution of more specialized diets is possibly due to the change to the 100 Kyr cycle after the Mid-Pleistocene Transition, which resulted in environmental stability allowing the development of more specialized forms.

S. kirchbergensis was broadly distributed over northern Eurasia from Western Europe to East Asia and the Russian Far East, while S. hemitoechus was generally confined to the western Palearctic, including Europe and North Africa.

In Europe, S. kirchbergensis disappeared during the earliest Late Pleistocene. The last records of S. hemitoechus in Italy date to around 41,000 years ago. A late record of S. hemitoechus is known from 40,000 years ago in Bacho Kiro cave in Bulgaria. Remains of S. kirchbergensis in the Russian Far East and South China are suggested to date to marine isotope stage 3 (~60-27,000 years ago) and 2 (~29-14,000 years ago), respectively.

References

Pleistocene rhinoceroses
Pleistocene genus extinctions
Prehistoric mammals of Europe
Pleistocene mammals of Asia